Martin Hyský (born 25 September 1975) is a Czech professional football manager and a former player. He is the manager of Vlašim.

Career
After a short spell at FK Přestanov, Hyský moved to FK Kunice in April 2011. In the summer 2013, he then moved to TJ Sokol Královice. In January 2014, Hyský also became head coach of Slavia Prague's U16s alongside his playing duties at Královice. He later left the position at Slavia to become a player-head coach at Královice.

Hyský left Královice in the summer 2017 and returned to Slavia, as an assistant coach of one of the youth teams.

In February 2019, Hyský took charge of Slavias' B-team. In June 2020 it was confirmed, that Hyský would take charge of the clubs U19s.

References

External links
 
 
 

1975 births
Living people
Czech footballers
Czech Republic youth international footballers
Czech Republic under-21 international footballers
Czech expatriate footballers
Czech First League players
SK Slavia Prague players
FC Slovan Liberec players
AIK Fotboll players
FC Zbrojovka Brno players
FC Dynamo Moscow players
FC Energie Cottbus players
Rot-Weiss Essen players
Kickers Offenbach players
SK Kladno players
FK Kunice players
Allsvenskan players
2. Bundesliga players
3. Liga players
Czech expatriate sportspeople in Sweden
Czech expatriate sportspeople in Russia
Czech expatriate sportspeople in Germany
Expatriate footballers in Sweden
Expatriate footballers in Russia
Expatriate footballers in Germany
Russian Premier League players
Association football defenders
Czech football managers
Association football coaches
SK Slavia Prague non-playing staff
Bohemians 1905 players
Footballers from Prague
FC Sellier & Bellot Vlašim managers
Czech National Football League managers